The 2012–13 season was the 64th season of competitive football in Pakistan.

Changes in the Pakistan Premier League
Teams promoted to the 2012–13 Pakistan Premier League:
 Zarai Taraqiati
 Wohaib

Teams relegated from the 2012–13 Pakistan Premier League:
 Pakistan Police
 Pak Elektron

Internationals

Men

International friendlies

AFC Challenge Cup qualifications

Group B

League

Pakistan Premier League

National Football Challenge Cup

References

 
2012 in Pakistani sport
2013 in Pakistani sport
2012 in Asian football
2013 in Asian football
2012 in association football
2013 in association football